The Monterroso River (Rio Monterroso or Arroyo Monterroso) is a seasonal river that flows from the  mountains to Estepona, Andalusia, Spain, where it empties into the Mediterranean Sea. It remains dry through the average summer weather and flows during the winter rainy season depending on the amount of rain.

The river was originally culverted on the coast of Estepona in the 1960s for use as the paseo maritimo. However, a much larger culvert was constructed in the 1970s. It runs underground in the city of Estepona, beginning at Calle Monterroso.

On January 12, 1973, the dossiers were signed to construct the modern rectangular Monterroso Culvert. Construction started in April 1973 and ended in June 1974. It took  to complete. The name of the work was "Embovedado del arroyo Monterroso" and the construction company was Construcciones Civiles, S. A.

The culvert is located directly under Av. Juan Carlos I, the main road in Estepona. The outfall of the culvert is located on the southern end of the Av. Juan Carlos I. The river culvert was constructed to form the Av.

The construction of the Monterroso river culvert had a base budget of 55,105,234 Pesetas, The bid price on March 29, 1973, was 51,247,869 Pesetas.

On October 11, 1986, the separate 1960s culvert that the Monterroso river flowed through via the newer culvert collapsed. A sewage treatment truck was engulfed, but the operator managed to get out in time. The collapse created a 700 square metre sinkhole and sparked the construction of the rest of the culvert to engulf the original location of the collapsed bridge maintaining the shape and size of the original box culvert in 1987.

As of 2015, there were plans to build a river park along the banks of a portion of the Monterroso river in Estepona.

In 2017, the plans to build the river park lacked authorization and were never instated; however, a beautification project was conducted.

Inside the River Monterroso culvert, the Arroyo de Juan Benítez flows in via another culvert which is also over a kilometre in length. In 2018, plans to resize a portion of the culvert were successfully completed.

The resizing was conducted by Constructions y Excavations Manzano and cost 5 million euros ($6 million) to conduct.

Historical designs of Arroyo De Juan Benítez culvert

The 3rd version of the Arroyo de Juan Benítez is located on the eastern wall of the Monterroso culvert, flowing directly under the Calle Parque central. Version 3 is the largest of all versions of arroyo de Juan Benítez culverts. This is one of 3 versions of outfalls located on the eastern wall of the Monterroso culvert. Version 3 was built to relieve version 2, which had a 90° (right angle) internal bend and caused problems with water flow. It consists of a 5-foot tall rectangular concrete outfall, with ceilings that slope up to 6'5" inside and slant to the right. This shape limits the flow of the Juan Benítez stream in times of flooding to minimize erosion, and prevents the Monterroso river from backing up into the Juan Benítez culvert. 

It was 22 November 1989 when the 3rd version of the Juan Benítez culvert was announced to be ongoing construction. Whilst heavy storms and flooding occurred during an news interview with the mayor of Estepona, it was said that the Arroyo De Juan Benítez Embovedamiento project was very important and the new embovedado would be completed if they managed to get enough concentrated personnel.

Version 2 of the Juan Benítez culvert outfall is located 160 metres north from the current version Juan Benítez outfall. It is same shape, except with slightly smaller height, and stays the same height its entire length. It had a 90° bend inside that caused hydraulic problems which was the reason the third version of the culvert was built. 

Version 2 previously was built to relieve version 1 of its duties as it also had a 90° (right angle) bend. Due to the circumstances, the version-2 culvert was built with the same exact same right angle as before, which was later resolved in the version-3 modern day culvert.

The 1st version of the culvert is located quite a distance from the previous outfalls and is located only 140 metres from the northern inlet of the Rio Monterroso culvert. Its outfall is located directly under Av. J. Martín. Mendéz and it has a different design than the other two, consisting of a vaulted ceiling and a channel on the floor designed to channel the water through the centre so that water does not accumulate. It was built with a 90° (right angle) bend that was located under San Fernando football stadium.

Versions 1 and 2 are now both bricked up and unused. Version 2 has accumulated silt and concrete debris from lack of use.

Original culvert

In 1881, with the construction of the n340 highway, A bridge was constructed over the river for the passing of vehicles.

The n340 is a road over 1000 km long, was the only road connecting two halves of southern Andalusia, and had large amounts of traffic. The culvert was originally budgeted at 294,053.93 Pesetas however the finish price costed 9,828,431.02 Pesetas.

Like the original Monterroso river culvert, most Spanish culverts from that era featured a vaulted ceiling, which is where the name "Embovedado" comes from when associated with culverts in Spain.

In 1970 the original 60s culvert was extended with a rectangular beam bridge with a span of about 10 metres, 3 years later the modern Av de Juan Carlos 1 culvert was constructed using the same dimensions as the bridge. The arches of the original culvert were embedded into the bridge.

On October 10, 1986, due to the funneling effect of the rectangular culvert, the 1965 culvert shifted breaking apart the surrounding bridges, causing a 700 square metre sinkhole.

Drainage

Inside the Monterroso river culvert, there are storm drains and sewers connected to the outfall into the culvert system via pipes. The pipes range from 5 inches to 4 feet in size, and there are over 500 outlet pipes that flow into the Monterroso culvert.

However, the most common seems to be 8-inch concrete cut-outs in the wall that were created when the culvert was first constructed. These pipes are called lateral pipes and are installed using a core-cutting machine into the walls.

Lateral pipes installed during construction are created by casting the concrete wall and creating a template in the desired shape/size of the pipe in the liquid concrete.

These consequences could range from the simple unwanted factors of the river water back flowing into the lateral pipe, to turbulence in the water flow potentially inducing currents that erode its surroundings.

Gallery

See also 

 Mediterranean Sea

References

Rivers of Andalusia